Ferenc Forgács (also reported as Forgách, born 25 September 1891 – 25 August 1950) was a Slovak track and field athlete who competed for Hungary in the 1912 Summer Olympics. He was born in Bratislava, Austria-Hungary. In 1912 he was eliminated in the first round of the 800 metres competition as well as of the 1500 metres event.

References

External links
Ferenc Forgács. Sports Reference. Retrieved on 2015-02-08.
profile 
Mention of Ferenc Forgács' death

1891 births
1950 deaths
Hungarian male middle-distance runners
Olympic athletes of Hungary
Olympic athletes of Slovakia
Athletes (track and field) at the 1912 Summer Olympics
Sportspeople from Bratislava